DeDe Duncan-Probe is the eleventh and current bishop of the Episcopal Diocese of Central New York.

Biography
Duncan-Probe graduated with a Bachelor of Science in education from Stephen F. Austin State University. She also has a Master of Arts in psychology from Pepperdine University  and a Master of Divinity from General Theological Seminary. She also has a Doctor of Philosophy from The Foundation House/ Oxford University.

She was ordained priest in 2004 and has served in All Saints’ Church in Stoneham, Massachusetts, St John's Church in McLean, Virginia, and Holy Comforter Church in Vienna, Virginia. She also served as Prior to rector of St Peter's in the Woods Church in Fairfax Station, Virginia between 2009 and 2016. She was also Dean of Region VII of the Diocese of Virginia.

She was elected Bishop of Central New York on August 6, 2016, and was consecrated bishop on December 3, 2016, at the Holiday Inn Convention Center in Liverpool, New York by Presiding Bishop Michael Curry.

References

Women Anglican bishops
Living people
Year of birth missing (living people)
Stephen F. Austin State University alumni
Pepperdine University alumni
General Theological Seminary alumni
Episcopal bishops of Central New York